Albert Mousson, full name Johann Rudolf Albert Mousson, (17 March 1805, Solothurn – 16 November 1890) was a physicist and a malacologist from Switzerland.

Taxa described

Gastropods
Taxa described by Albert Mousson include (sorted chronologically):

1847
 Cochlostoma apricum (Mousson, 1847)

1848
 Amphidromus palaceus (Mousson, 1848)
 Amphidromus porcellanus (Mousson, 1848)

1849
 Asperitas rareguttata Mousson, 1849
 Melampus granifer (Mousson, 1849)
 Sulcospira infracostata (Mousson, 1849)
 Sulcospira sulcospira (Mousson, 1849)
 Tylomelania perfecta (Mousson, 1849)

1854
 Albinaria virgo (Mousson, 1854)
 Assyriella bellardii (Mousson, 1854)
 Caucasotachea nordmanni (Mousson, 1854)
 Chondrus limbodentatus var. abbreviatus Mousson, 1854 (no current allocation known)
 Chondrus truquii Mousson, 1854 (no current allocation known)
 Euchondrus limbodentatus (Mousson, 1854)
 Helix nucula Mousson, 1854
 Helix nicosiana var. pallida Mousson, 1854 (no current allocation known)
 Helix pomacella Mousson, 1854
 Levantina caesareana (Mousson, 1854)
 Melanopsis brevis Mousson, 1854 (no current allocation known)
 Metafruticicola nicosiana (Mousson, 1854)
 Neritina bellardii Mousson, 1854 (no current allocation known)
 Orculella sirianocoriensis (Mousson, 1854)
 Paludina badiella Mousson, 1854 (no current allocation known)
 Pupa lindermeyeri Mousson, 1854 (no current allocation known)
 Truncatella hammerschmidtiana Mousson, 1854 (no current allocation known)
 Helicigona hymetti (Mousson, 1854)
 Helix olivieri var. dilucida Mousson, 1854 (no current allocation known)
 Helix meridionalis Mousson, 1854 (no current allocation known)
 Asperitas sparsa Mousson, 1854
 Cernuella jonica (Mousson, 1854)

1856
 Clausilia firmata Mousson, 1856 (no current allocation known)
 Clausilia multilamellata Mousson, 1856 (no current allocation known)
 Clausilia unilamellata Mousson, 1856 (no current allocation known)
 Helix squamulosa Mousson, 1856 (no current allocation known)
 Pilorcula trifilaris (Mousson, 1856)
 Pontophaedusa funiculum (Mousson, 1856)
 Pupa schlaeflii Mousson, 1856 (no current allocation known)

1857
 Asperitas sparsa baliensis Mousson, 1857
 Asperitas waandersiana (Mousson, 1857) / Asperitas trochus waandersiana Mousson, 1857
 Dyakia clypeus (Mousson, 1857)
 Theba clausoinflata (Mousson, 1857)
 Theba geminata (Mousson, 1857)
 Theba impugnata (Mousson, 1857)

1858
 Balea nitida Mousson, 1858

1859
 Allaegopis transiens (Mousson, 1859)
 Bulimus subtilis var. corcyrensis Mousson, 1859 (no current allocation known)
 Bulimus tumidus Mousson, 1859
 Clausilia auriformis Mousson, 1859
 Helicigona subzonata (Mousson, 1859)
 Helix ambigua Mousson, 1859 (no current allocation known)
 Helix ambigua var. borealis Mousson, 1859 (no current allocation known)
 Helix corcyrensis var. cefalonica Mousson, 1859 (no current allocation known)
 Helix sericea var. epirotica Mousson, 1859 (no current allocation known)
 Helix corcyrensis var. octogyrata Mousson, 1859 (no current allocation known)
 Helix schlaeflii Mousson, 1859 (no current allocation known)
 Mastus grandis (Mousson, 1859)
 Monacha frequens (Mousson, 1859)
 Montenegrina janinensis Mousson, 1859
 Montenegrina rugilabris (Mousson, 1859)
 Napaeopsis cefalonica (Mousson, 1859)
 Isabellaria vallata (Mousson, 1859)
 Planorbis janinensis Mousson, 1859 (no current allocation known)
 Poiretia compressa (Mousson, 1859)
 Pupa philippii var. exigua Mousson, 1859 (no current allocation known)
 Pupa minutissima var. obscura Mousson, 1859 (no current allocation known)
 Viviparus janinensis (Mousson, 1859)
 Xeromunda vulgarissima (Mousson, 1859)

1861
 Euchondrus albulus (Mousson, 1861)
 Euchondrus chondriformis (Mousson, 1861)
 Helix texta Mousson, 1861
 Sphincterochila zonata filia (Mousson, 1861)

1863
 Monacha solidior (Mousson, 1863)
 Pseudamnicola sphaerion (Mousson, 1863)

1865
 Diastole schmeltziana (Mousson, 1865)
 Diastole schmeltziana usurpata (Mousson, 1869)
 Truncatella rustica Mousson, 1865

1869
 Melampus semisulcatus Mousson, 1869
 Pedinogyra minor (Mousson, 1869)
 Pythia savaiensis (Mousson, 1869)
 genus Trochonanina Mousson, 1869

1870
 Omphalotropis costulata (Mousson, 1870)

1872
 Acanthinula spinifera Mousson, 1872
 Hemicycla inutilis Mousson, 1872
 subgenus Nautilinus Mousson, 1872
 Theba grasseti (Mousson, 1872)
 Xerotricha adoptata (Mousson, 1872)
 Xerotricha nodosostriata (Mousson, 1872)

1873
 Omphalotropis albocarinata Mousson, 1873
 Plekocheilus ampullaroides (Mousson, 1873)
 Plekocheilus subglandiformis (Mousson, 1873)
 Rhodea gigantea Mousson, 1873
 genus Serrulina Mousson, 1873

1874
 Bithynia ejecta Mousson, 1874
 Euchondrus borealis (Mousson, 1874)
 Gyraulus euphraticus (Mousson, 1874)
 Monacha merssinae (Mousson, 1874)
 Neritina euphratica Mousson, 1874
 Neritina schlaeflii Mousson, 1874
 Orculella mesopotamica (Mousson, 1874)
 Planorbis intermixtus Mousson, 1874
 Pseudochondrula arctespira (Mousson, 1874)
 Radix hordeum (Mousson, 1874)
 Xeropicta mesopotamica (Mousson, 1874)

1876
 Ljudmilena tricollis (Mousson, 1876)

1887
 Pila occidentalis (Mousson, 1887)

year ?
 Pupilla signata (Mousson)

Bivalves

1854
 Cyrena crassula Mousson, 1854 (no current allocation known)

1874
 Cyrena tigridis Mousson, 1874
 Anodonta mesopotamica Mousson, 1874
 Anodonta schlaeflii Mousson, 1874

References

External links 

 portrait
  Crosse H. & Fischer P. (1891). "Nécrologie". Journal de Conchyliologie 39(1): 66-67.
 Dodge H. (1946). "A letter concerning the cones of Hwass and other collections in Switzerland". The Nautilus 59(3): 97-101.
 Meier T. (1994). "Albert Mousson (1805-1890) und seine Sammlung in Zürich. Mitteilungen der Deutschen Malakozoologischen Gesellschaft 54: 9-10.
  Schneider G. (1891). "Albert Mousson". Nachrichtsblatt der Deutschen Malakozoologischen Gesellschaft 23(1-2): 1-3.

1805 births
1890 deaths
Swiss malacologists
19th-century Swiss physicists